GPS Block IIIF, or GPS III Follow On (GPS IIIF), is the second set of GPS Block III satellites, consisting of up to 22 space vehicles. The United States Air Force began the GPS Block IIIF acquisition effort in 2016. On 14 September 2018, a manufacturing contract with options worth up to $7.2 billion was awarded to Lockheed Martin. The 22 satellites in Block IIIF are projected to start launching in 2027, with launches estimated to last through at least 2034.

System Enhancements 

Engineering efforts for Block IIIF satellites began upon contract award in 2016 -- a full 16 years after the government approved entry into the initial modernization efforts for GPS III in 2000. As a result, GPS Block IIIF introduces a number of improvements and novel capabilities compared to all previous GPS satellite blocks.

System Improvements

Redesigned Nuclear Detonation Detection System Payload 

Block IIIF satellites host a redesigned U.S.  Nuclear Detonation Detection System (USNDS) solution that is both smaller and lighter.

The USNDS is a worldwide system of space-based sensors and ground processing equipment designed to detect, identify, locate, characterize, and report nuclear detonations in the earth's atmosphere and in space.

Fully-Digital Navigation Payload 

GPS IIIF satellites are the first to feature a 100% digital navigation payload.

The fully-digital navigation payload first introduced by Block IIIF (SV11+) produces improved accuracy, better reliability, and stronger signals compared to the 70% digital navigation payload used by GPS Block III (SV01-SV10).

Improved Satellite Bus 

GPS IIIF-03 and beyond (GPS III SV13+) will incorporate the Lockheed Martin LM2100 Combat Bus, an improvement on the LM2100M bus used in GPS III SV01 through SV12. The LM2100 Combat Bus provides improved resiliency to cyber attacks, as well as improved spacecraft power, propulsion, and electronics.

Novel Capabilities

Energetic Charged Particle Sensor 

GPS IIIF satellites will be the first GPS satellites to host an Energetic Charged Particle (ECP) sensor payload.

In March 2015, the  U.S. Secretary of the Air Force enacted policy mandating all new Air Force satellite programs must include ECP sensors. Aggregating ECP data from multiple satellites allows for enhanced  space domain awareness, enabling improved detection of  space weather effects as well as differentiation between anomalies induced by hostile activity, the natural environment, or other non-hostile causes.

Search and Rescue Distress Beacon Payload 

GPS IIIF will be the first GPS satellite block to have all space vehicles participate in the Cospas-Sarsat system. The Cospas-Sarsat system is an international collection of satellites spanning low-earth, medium-earth and geostationary orbit satellites which all listen for 406 MHz distress signals generated by beacons on earth. Satellites relay distress signals to ground stations to initiate timely emergency response efforts.

Laser Retro-Reflector Array 

Adding laser  retro-reflector arrays (LRAs) to all GPS IIIF Space Vehicles allows GPS monitoring stations on earth equipped with laser rangefinding equipment to determine much more precise 3D locations for every GPS IIIF satellite. Having more precise location information for each GPS satellite improves the ability of the GPS system to provide more accurate time/position fixes to GPS receivers. Estimates are that as more GPS satellites host LRAs, the location accuracy will improve from one meter achievable today to one centimeter accuracy, an improvement of several orders of magnitude.

Unified S-Band Capability Compliance 

Block IIIF will be compliant with the Unified S-Band (USB) capabilities, allowing for consolidation of radio frequencies used for telemetry, tracking, and commanding of Block IIIF satellites.

Regional Military Protection Capability 

Regional Military Protection (RMP) is an anti-jamming technology for military GPS consumers. RMP involves directing a massively-amplified  spot beam which only includes military GPS signals over a small geographic area. US/allied military GPS receivers located within the RMP spot beam's signal footprint are significantly more difficult for adversaries to jam due to the extremely-amplified signal strength in the area.

On-Orbit Servicing/Upgrade 

GPS IIIF-03 and newer satellites (GPS III SV13+) will incorporate Lockheed-Martin's LM2100 Combat Bus. Satellites based on the Combat Bus are capable of hosting the "Augmentation System Port Interface" (ASPIN), an interface that allows for future on-orbit servicing and upgrade opportunities.

Launch history 

The first GPS Block IIIF satellite is scheduled to launch in FY2027.

Navigational Signals 

Note: none of the navigation signals that GPS Block IIIF satellites transmit are new in Block IIIF; all signals were first supported in previous generation (Block I, Block II, or Block III) GPS satellites.

Civilian

Design 

GPS IIIF is an evolution of GPS III, which uses the A2100 bus as its core. The new models use the modernized LM2100 bus along with a fully digital navigation payload from L3Harris, a significant upgrade from the previous 70% digital payload used in GPS III.

An upgraded version known as the LM2100 Combat Bus will be used starting with the third service vehicle. It will enable on-orbit servicing at a later date, which may include hardware upgrades, component replacement, or refuelling.

Medium Earth Orbit Search and Rescue (MEOSAR) payloads are being provided by the Canadian government on behalf of the Canadian Armed Forces. The time it takes to detect and locate a distress signal will be reduced from an hour to five minutes, along with greatly improved accuracy in locating a distress beacon.

Laser Retroreflector Arrays (LRAs) will be built by the Naval Research Lab. This is a passive reflector system that improves accuracy and provides better ephemeris data. The National Geospatial-Intelligence Agency (NGA) will fund the integration costs of the LRA.

Other significant enhancements include: unified S-Band (USB) interface compliance, integration of hosted payloads including a redesigned United States Nuclear Detonation (NUDET) Detection System (USNDS) payload, Energetic Charged Particles (ECP) sensor, and Regional Military Protection (RMP) capabilities that provide the ability to deliver high-power regional Military Code (M-Code) signals in specific areas of intended effect.

The Air Force has identified four "technology insertion points" for GPS Block IIIF. These four points are the only four times during the block's lifecycle where new capabilities will be allowed to be introduced to Block IIIF satellites.

Technology Insertion Point 1 (estimated FY2026) 
 First Space Vehicle: GPS IIIF-01
 Proposed/possible new functionality:
 On Orbit Reprogrammable Digital Payload 
 High Power Amplifiers (SSPA's) 
 Regional Military Protection (RMP)

Technology Insertion Point 2 (estimated FY2028) 
 First Space Vehicle: GPS IIIF-07
 Proposed/possible new functionality:
 M-Code Space Service Volume

Technology Insertion Point 3 (estimated FY2030) 
 First Space Vehicle: GPS IIIF-13
 Proposed/possible new functionality:
 Near Real-Time Commanding
 Advanced Clocks

Technology Insertion Point 4 (estimated FY2033) 
 First Space Vehicle: GPS IIIF-19
 Proposed/possible new functionality:
 TBD

Development

Space Segment (Satellites) 
The U.S. Air Force employed a two-phase competitive bid acquisition process for the GPS Block IIIF satellites.

Phase One: Production Feasibility Assessment 
On 5 May 2016, the U.S. Air Force awarded three Phase One Production Readiness Feasibility Assessment contracts for GPS III Space Vehicles (SV's) 11+, one each to Boeing Network and Space Systems, Lockheed Martin Space Systems Company, and Northrop Grumman Aerospace Systems. The phase one contracts were worth up to six million dollars each. During the phase one effort, both Boeing and Northrop Grumman successfully demonstrated working navigation payloads.

Phase Two: Satellite Manufacturing 
On 19 April 2017, the US Air Force Space Command announced the start of the second phase of its acquisition strategy with the publication of a special notice for an "Industry Day" for companies planning on bidding for the contract to manufacture GPS III vehicles 11+. During the Industry Day event, the Air Force shared the tentative acquisition strategy which it will use to evaluate proposals, then solicited feedback from potential bidders.

In July 2017, the Deputy Director of the U.S. Air Force GPS Directorate stated the acquisition strategy for GPS Block IIIF would be to award the manufacturing contracts for all 22 Block IIIF satellites to the same contractor.

In November 2017, the Deputy Director of the US Air Force's GPS Directorate announced the name of the second tranche of GPS III satellites was "GPS Block IIIF".

Also in November 2017, it was announced that development of the fully digital navigation payload for GPS Block IIIF satellites had completed. The Block IIIA program schedule was delayed multiple times due to issues with the navigation payload.

Bidding 
While the Air Force originally expected to publish the formal Request For Proposals (RFP) for GPS Block IIIF production in September 2017, it was not released until 13 February 2018. The RFP was for a firm-fixed price (FFP) contract for a single company to manufacture all 22 space vehicles. All three participants from phase one (Boeing, Lockheed Martin, and Northrop Grumman) were believed to be likely to submit proposals. The government held a pre-proposal conference in El Segundo, California, to be held on 15 March 2018 for potential bidders to ask the Air Force questions about the solicitation. The submission deadline for proposals was 12:00 pm Pacific Daylight Time (PDT) on 16 April 2018.

The bid status of companies who participated in phase one, in alphabetical order:
 Boeing: declined to submit a proposal 
 Lockheed Martin: submitted a proposal 
 Northrop: declined to submit a proposal

Funding  

On 14 September 2018, the Air Force awarded a manufacturing contract with options worth up to US$7.2 billion to Lockheed Martin.

Control Segment (Ground-Based Command & Control) 

GPS Block IIIF's ground control system of record will be the same used for GPS Block III, the Next Generation GPS Operational Control System (OCX).

In order to be able to command and control Block IIIF satellites, in April 2021 the U.S. Space Force awarded a $228 million contract to Raytheon Intelligence and Space called OCX Block 3F, which builds on the existing OCX Block 2 system and adds the ability to do Launch and Checkout of Block IIIF satellites.

OCX Block 3F delivery is expected in July 2025, with operational acceptance expected in late 2027.

See also 

 BeiDou Navigation Satellite System
 BeiDou-2 (COMPASS) navigation system
 Galileo (satellite navigation)
 GLONASS
 Quasi-Zenith Satellite System

References 

Global Positioning System